The Kaipara District is located in the Northland Region in northern New Zealand.

History
Kaipara District was formed through the 1989 New Zealand local government reforms and was constituted on 1 November 1989. It was made up of five former boroughs and counties: all of Hobson County, Dargaville Borough, Otamatea County, and parts of Rodney County and Whangarei County. In addition, it took over the functions of the Raupo Drainage Board, Kaiwaka Reserve Board, and the Pahi Reserve Boards.

Geography

Kaipara District is located in the rolling hills around the northern shores of the Kaipara Harbour, a large natural harbour open to the Tasman Sea. Kaipara District Council shares management of the harbour with various other organisations, most notably Northland Regional Council (in the north) and Auckland Council to the south.

The roughly triangular district stretches from a thinning of the Northland Peninsula south of Kaiwaka and Mangawhai in the southeast to the Waipoua Forest in the northwest. The District's western boundary is defined by Ripiro Beach which stretches down Northland’s west coast from Maunganui Bluff and the Waipoua Forest in the North, to Pouto at the entrance to the Kaipara Harbour. The region is bisected by the Northern Wairoa River and its tributaries, which flow into the northern end of the Kaipara Harbour.

Population centres
The District has no major urban centre but does have numerous towns and villages including Dargaville (the primary service centre in the west), Ruawai, Matakohe, Paparoa, Maungaturoto, Kaiwaka, Mangawhai, Tinopai, Te Kopuru, Kaihu, Pahi and Whakapirau as well as the rural area which surrounds them.

The population is largely rural, living in small settlements scattered amongst the rolling hills or nestled on the shores of the harbour, including the harbour villages of Tinopai, Pahi and Whakapirau. The area around Dargaville is noted for the high proportion of residents of Dalmatian descent and has an active Dalmatian Club.

The nearest city is Whangarei, 45 kilometres northeast of Dargaville.

Community spirit is strong among the various rural communities, as is evident by the numerous local clubs, volunteer organisations and other initiatives. Dargaville has an annual Arts and Crafts Festival run by the local Rotary club and also features weekly Riverside Produce Markets on Thursday afternoons.

Maungaturoto has a monthly market on a Friday from 4pm to 7pm at the Maungaturoto Hall and also has a volunteer group (Maungaturoto Residents Association) dedicated to beautifying the town.
A similar volunteer group also exists in Ruawai and Paparoa (Progressive Paparoa).

Demographics

Kaipara District had a population of 22,869 at the 2018 New Zealand census, an increase of 3,906 people (20.6%) since the 2013 census, and an increase of 4,734 people (26.1%) since the 2006 census. There were 8,748 households. There were 11,520 males and 11,349 females, giving a sex ratio of 1.02 males per female. The median age was 46.0 years (compared with 37.4 years nationally), with 4,425 people (19.3%) aged under 15 years, 3,354 (14.7%) aged 15 to 29, 10,020 (43.8%) aged 30 to 64, and 5,073 (22.2%) aged 65 or older.

Ethnicities were 83.3% European/Pākehā, 24.6% Māori, 3.8% Pacific peoples, 2.8% Asian, and 1.7% other ethnicities. People may identify with more than one ethnicity.

The percentage of people born overseas was 14.2, compared with 27.1% nationally.

Although some people objected to giving their religion, 51.9% had no religion, 34.5% were Christian, 2.7% had Māori religious beliefs, 0.5% were Hindu, 0.2% were Muslim, 0.4% were Buddhist and 1.4% had other religions.

Of those at least 15 years old, 2,085 (11.3%) people had a bachelor or higher degree, and 4,572 (24.8%) people had no formal qualifications. The median income was $24,500, compared with $31,800 nationally. 1,998 people (10.8%) earned over $70,000 compared to 17.2% nationally. The employment status of those at least 15 was that 7,803 (42.3%) people were employed full-time, 2,964 (16.1%) were part-time, and 639 (3.5%) were unemployed.

Local government
Kaipara District is divided into four wards:

 West Coast-Central
 Dargaville
 Otamatea
 Kaiwaka-Mangawhai

Before 2021 there were three wards.

On 6 September 2012, commissioners were appointed by the Minister of Local Government to take over the governance of the Kaipara District Council. The appointment followed the completion of the work of the review team which had been put in place by the Minister of Local Government in June 2012 to assess the financial management and governance challenges facing the council.  The review team concluded that the challenges were beyond the ability of the mayor and councillors to manage.  The elected council agreed and asked the Minister to appoint commissioners. The Kaipara District Council commissioners were John Robertson (chairman), Richard Booth, Colin Dale and Peter Winder.

In 2016, a new Kaipara District Council was elected, with Peter Winder guiding the council as Crown manager. In 2019 the council returned to full self-management.

See also
Regions in New Zealand
Territorial authorities of New Zealand

References

External links

 Kaipara District Council website
  Maungaturoto Website